Peter Bradbury (born 2 July 1958) is a former Australian rules footballer who played with Essendon and Collingwood in the VFL during the 1980s.

A half-back flanker, Bradbury was a premiership player at Essendon in 1984. He missed out on selection in their premiership side the following season and in 1986 was traded to Collingwood as Essendon needed to make room for Geoff Raines.

External links

1958 births
Living people
Essendon Football Club players
Essendon Football Club Premiership players
Collingwood Football Club players
Port Melbourne Football Club players
Australian rules footballers from Victoria (Australia)
One-time VFL/AFL Premiership players